Lisa Raymond and Rennae Stubbs were the defending champions, but lost in semifinals to tournament winners Julie Halard-Decugis and Ai Sugiyama.

Halard-Decugis and Sugiyama won the title by defeating Martina Hingis and Anna Kournikova 4–6, 6–4, 7–6(7–5) in the final.

Seeds

Draw

Draw

Qualifying

Qualifying seeds

Qualifiers
  Elena Bovina /  Tatiana Panova

Qualifying draw

External links
 Official results archive (ITF)
 Official results archive (WTA)

Kremlin Cup
Kremlin Cup